Rose is a female given name. It is a late Latin name derived from rosa, meaning "rose". Variants are Rosa, Rosario, Rosie, Rosalba, Rosalie, Rosalia, Rosina, Rosaria and Rosalina. Similar names are Rosanna, Roseanne and Rosamunde. It may be a short form of Rosemary.

History
Rose was originally a Norman form of a German name Hrodheid, composed of the words Hrod ("fame") and Heid ("kind", "type"). It was originally spelled (by the Normans) Roese or Rohese. It was used in England, Italy, and France throughout the Middle Ages, and its popularity increased during the 19th century while still regarded as being a flower name. The name of the flower has the etymology of Old English rōse from the Latin rosa; phonetically linked to the Greek rhódon, which is independent of the etymology of the surname Rose. Distinctions can sometimes be made between individuals who derive this given name after the surname and those who are named after the flower.

Rhoda, as in Acts 12:12-15, is the Greek equivalent. St. Rose of Lima was the first person born in the Americas to be canonized.

Other language variants 
Czech: Rosalie, Rosálie, Rosarie, Růžena
Danish: Rosalie
Dutch: Roos, Rosa, Rosalie 
French: Rose, Rosalie
Galician: Rosalía
Greek: Rhodē  ˁΡόδη
Hungarian: Rozália
Irish: Róisín
Italian: Rosalia, Rosaria, Rusalia
Latvian: Roze, Roza, Rozālija, Rozīte (diminutive)
Portuguese: Rosa, Rosália, Rosária,  Rosy , Rose (mainly in Brazil, e.g. Rose de Freitas), Rosinha (pet form)
Polish: Rozalia, Róża
Serbo-Croatian: Ruža, Ružica, Rozalija
Slovak: Rozália, Remmie, Ružena
Spanish: Rosalía, Rosa, Rosario

People with the given name  
Mary Tudor, Queen of France (1496–1533), sister of King Henry VIII of England, known as "Mary Rose"
Rose of Viterbo (1233–1251), Italian saint  
Rose (French singer) (born 1978), French singer-songwriter
Rose-Alexandrine Barreau (1773–1843), French soldier
Rose Byrne (born 1979), Australian actress, best known for her role on the American television series Damages
Rose Chen Aijie, Chinese saint  
Rose Cleveland (1846–1918), acting First Lady of the United States from 1885 to 1886
Rose Combe (1883–1932), French writer
Rose Philippine Duchesne (1769–1852), French-American saint  
Rose Dugdale (born 1941), English heiress who joined the Provisional Irish Republican Army
Rose Fan Hui, Chinese saint 
Rose Fitzgerald Kennedy (1890–1995), mother of American president John F. Kennedy and his brothers, Robert F. Kennedy and Senator Ted Kennedy
Rose Gaffney (1895–1979), American environmental activist
Lady Rose Gilman, member of the British Royal Family
Rose Goldblatt (1913–1997), Canadian administrator, pianist and teacher
Rose Hart (born 1942), Ghanaian track and field athlete
Rose Henderson (1871–1937), Canadian political and social activist
Rose Hill (actress) (1914–2003), British actress
Rose Hill (athlete), British wheelchair athlete
Rose Hilton (1931–2019), English painter
Rose Hobart (1906–2000), American actress 
Rose Kennedy (1890-1995), American philanthropist, socialite, and a member of the Kennedy family
Rose Marie "Rosemary" Kennedy (1918-2005), a member of the Kennedy family.
Rose Kim (given name also spelled "Rosa" or "Nosa"), Korean saint
Rose Laurens (1953–2018), French singer-songwriter
Rose Leslie (born 1987), Scottish actress
Rose Leveson-Gower (1890–1967), British aristocrat
Rose Marie (1923–2017), American actress
Rose McGowan (born 1973), American actress
Rose McIver (born 1988), New Zealand actress
Rose Mooney-Slater (1902–1981), American physicist
Rose Montoya, American model, internet celebrity, and transgender activist
Rose Mortem, American musician and fashion designer
Rose Nabinger, German singer-songwriter
Rose Napoli, Canadian playwright and actor
Roseline Osipitan, Nigerian businesswoman and Yoruban princess
Rose Pacatte, American film critic and Catholic nun
Rose Pere (1937–2020), Māori New Zealand educationalist and spiritual leader
 Moriah Rose Pereira, American singer, songwriter, musician, and YouTuber known as Poppy 
Roseanne Park, stage name Rosé, New Zealand-born K-pop singer of Blackpink
Rose Porteous (born 1948), Filipino-born Australian socialite
Rose Rollins (born 1981), American actress
Rose Schneiderman (1882–1972), Polish-born American labor organizer and socialist
Rosalie Selfridge, known as Rose Selfridge (1860–1918), property developer
Rose Stone (born 1945), African-American singer and keyboardist for Sly & the Family Stone
Rose Venkatesan, Indian transgender talk show host
Rose Wilder Lane (1886–1968), American journalist and political theorist, daughter of Laura Ingalls Wilder
Rose Zhao, Chinese saint  
Rose Zhang, American golfer
Darcy Rose Byrnes (born 1998), American actress
Pernille Rose Grønkjær (born 1973), Danish director
Julianna Rose Mauriello, American actress
Kathleen Rose Perkins (born 1974), American actress
Amber Rose Revah (born 1968), American actress
Rose, stylist and cast member on Love & Hip Hop: New York

Fictional characters
Rose (Keeping Up Appearances)
Rose (Two and a Half Men)
Rose (Titans character)
Rose (Marvel Comics), a persona used by several characters in Marvel Comics
The Rose (comics) or Richard Fisk, a character in Marvel Comics
Rose, from the Japanese anime Dragon Crisis!
Rose, one of the main characters in the role-playing video game Legend of Dragoon
Chairman Rose, from the game Pokémon Sword and Shield
Laterose, known as simply Rose, a fictional character from RedwallRedwall
Rose/Huntsgirl, a supporting character and Jake Long's main romantic interest, sweetheart, and official girlfriend in American Dragon: Jake Long
Rose (Street Fighter), from the Street Fighter video game series
Rose DeWitt Bukater, one of two main characters from the 1997 film Titanic
Rose Cameron, a recurring character in the Netflix series Outer Banks
Rose Canton of Rose and Thorn, a Golden Age DC Comics villainess
Rose Da Silva, from the 2006 film Silent Hill
Rose Granger-Weasley, daughter of Ronald Weasley and Hermione Granger in the Harry Potter books
Rose Hathaway, the main character of the Vampire Academy series
Rose Henderson (Rose Nadler), from the ABC TV show Lost
Rose Kaminski, a character from the 1998 American comedy movie My Giant
Rose Lalonde, from the webcomic Homestuck
Rose Lavillant, from Miraculous: Tales of Ladybug & Cat Noir
Rose Nylund, from the TV series The Golden Girls
Rose O'Reilly, a character played by Jennifer Aniston in the 2013 American crime comedy movie We're the Millers
Rose Ortiz, the pink Ranger from Power Rangers Operation Overdrive
Rose Quartz, from the animated series Steven Universe
Rose Sargent, from the musical Rose of Washington Square
Rose Taylor, a character from the TV show 7th Heaven
Rosé Thomas, in the Japanese anime and manga series Fullmetal Alchemist
Rose Tico, from Star Wars: The Last Jedi
Rose Tyler, a companion of the Doctor in the BBC series Doctor Who
Rose Walker, from the Sandman comics series
Rose Who, a character in the 2000 American Christmas fantasy comedy movie How the Grinch Stole Christmas
Rose Wilson, daughter of Deathstroke (Slade) in the DC Comics universe
Rose Zsigmond, a character in the 1994 American coming-of-age comedy-drama movie My Girl 2

See also
 Jouri
 Roser (name), given name and surname
 Rose (surname)

References

English feminine given names
Given names derived from plants or flowers
Scottish feminine given names
Welsh feminine given names

cs:Růžena
de:Rosa (Vorname)
fr:Rosalie (prénom)
it:Rosalia
hu:Rozália
pl:Rozalia
ru:Розалия
sk:Rozália
sk:Ružena
sl:Rozalia
fi:Rosa (nimi)
sv:Rosa (namn)